404th may refer to:

404th Air Expeditionary Group, provisional United States Air Force unit assigned to the United States Air Forces in Europe
404th Bombardment Squadron or 904th Air Refueling Squadron, inactive United States Air Force unit
404th Fighter Group, inactive United States Army Air Force unit
404th Fighter Squadron or 186th Fighter Squadron flies the F-15C Eagle
404th Maneuver Enhancement Brigade, maneuver enhancement brigade of the United States Army National Guard in Illinois

See also
404 (number)
404 (disambiguation)
404, the year 404 (CDIV) of the Julian calendar
404 BC